LZ Cephei, also known by its Flamsteed designation 14 Cephei, is a star about 3,600 light years from the Earth, in the constellation Cepheus. Its apparent magnitude is 5.6, making it faintly visible to the naked eye of an observer far from city lights.  The star is a rotating ellipsoidal variable whose brightness, as measured by the Hipparcos satellite, varies between magnitude 5.52 and 5.61.

LZ Cephei was discovered to be a binary star by William Edmund Harper in 1931.
The orbital elements were first calculated by Robert Methven Petrie in 1962. It was discovered to be a variable star in 1972 by N. Kameswara Rao, using the Lick Observatory's 24 inch telescope. The star was given the variable star designation LZ Cephei in 1973. It was classified as an ellipsoidal variable by Hill et al. in 1976.

A 2011 study of LZ Cephei concluded that the existing data are best explained if the system is a semi-detached binary with either the primary or secondary star nearly filling its Roche lobe. The secondary star, now less massive than the primary, was originally the more massive star, and matter has been transferred from the secondary to the primary.

References

Rotating ellipsoidal variables
Cepheus (constellation)
108772
209481
Durchmusterung objects
Cephei, LZ
Cephei, 14
8406